José Fernandes (born 12 September 1934) is a Portuguese épée and sabre fencer. He competed in three events at the 1960 Summer Olympics.

References

External links
 

1934 births
Living people
Portuguese male épée fencers
Olympic fencers of Portugal
Fencers at the 1960 Summer Olympics
Sportspeople from Lisbon
Portuguese male sabre fencers